Ronaldão, also known as Estádio Dr. Ronaldo Junqueira,  is a multi-purpose stadium located in Poços de Caldas, Brazil. It is used mostly for football matches and hosts the home matches of Associação Atlética Caldense and Poços de Caldas Futebol Clube. The stadium has a maximum capacity of 14,000 people.

Ronaldão is owned by the Poços de Caldas Town Hall. The stadium's formal name honors Ronaldo Junqueira, who was Poços de Caldas' mayor during the stadium construction.

History
In 1979, the works on Ronaldão were completed. The inaugural match was played on September 4 of that year, when Corinthians beat Caldense 3–0. The first goal of the stadium was scored by Corinthians' Basílio.

The stadium's attendance record currently stands at 7,790, set on April 27, 1997 when Caldense and Cruzeiro drew 1–1.

References

Enciclopédia do Futebol Brasileiro, Volume 2 - Lance, Rio de Janeiro: Aretê Editorial S/A, 2001.

External links
Templos do Futebol
World Stadiums

Sports venues in Minas Gerais
Football venues in Minas Gerais
Multi-purpose stadiums in Brazil